was a Japanese guitarist and record producer.

Personal life, biography
He was a former member of the music unit stereo criminals. After the dissolution of the unit, he made a full-scale start of activities as a guitarist, provided, arranged, and produced his music to other artists. He was a support guitarist for Kōji Kikkawa and aiko, and also worked for them as an arranger.

He served as the second generation guitarist of the back band Gyakutai Glycogen of singer-songwriter Ringo Sheena, whom he married in November 2000 (announced in January 2001). They divorced in January 2002.

In 1999, he co-produced Kaori Kawamura's solo project "Sorrow" which resumed her music activities.

From 2009 to 2010, he produced a single and album for Shunsuke Kiyokiba, in which he helped in making the rock sounds.

He died at hospital due to illness at 21:31 on 26 January 2018. He was 49. According to Yahyoshi's affiliation office, he had been fighting illness for about two and a half years until his death, but said he was not releasing the details of his illness.

Works, arrangements, productions
a flood of circle – "Best Ride," "Hana" (arrangement-production)
Kana Uemura "Taisetsu na Hito" recorded track "Ashioto" (arrangement)
Catsuomaticdeath (production)
Kaori Kawamura (Sorrow) – Sorrow, Macaroni (work-arrangement, production)
Shunsuke Kiyokiba – "Jet," "Mahō no Kotoba," "Ale," "Kawaranai Koto," "again," Rock & Soul (arrangement-production)
Cool Joke – "Undo" (arrangement)
go!go!vanillas – Kameleon Lights recorded tracks "Bilin Girl," "Counter Action" (arrangement-production)
Hiroya Komeiji (arrangement-production)
Maika Shiratori (joint work-arrangement, co-production)
Strange Nude Cult – "Sorairo no Finale/Hana o Kau" (arrangement-production)
Naomi Tamura – "Casablanca Dandy" (Kenji Sawada cover. Joint with Hitoshi Takaba)
Tsubaki – "Style," "Hanabi" (co-composition, production)
Shintaro Hazama – Bourbon Street, Simple Man (production)
Maria (arrangement)
melody. – "Haruka" (arrangement)

Support
aiko
Mao Abe
Kaori Kawamura
Kōji Kikkawa
Shunsuke Kiyokiba 
Hiroya Komeiji
Ringo Sheena
Maika Shiratori
Naomi Tamura
Lost in Time

References

Notes

Citations

Japanese rock guitarists
Japanese male composers
Japanese music arrangers
Japanese record producers
Musicians from Fukuoka Prefecture
1968 births
2018 deaths